"Evening Falls..." is a song by Irish singer, songwriter and musician Enya. It was released in December 1988. It was released as the second single and as well as the eighth track from their second studio album, Watermark (1988). It is a new-age track that was written by Enya and Roma Ryan and produced by Nicky Ryan.

Critical reception
Music & Media commented, "Harking back to her Clannad days, this is in a similar vein to the theme tune to Harry's Game. Haunting stuff."

Music and lyrics
"Evening Falls..." is a song that Roma described as "a song of a spirit travelling". It is based on a ghost story that Roma had heard, about a woman who had recurring dreams of a house in America, only to accidentally come across it years later in England. Upon entering the house, its inhabitants become frightened of the woman as they explain she had haunted the house each time she dreamed about it. Nicky thought a melody Enya had written suited the story, which led to Roma writing a lyric inspired by it.

Track listing
 "Evening Falls..."
 "Oíche Chiún"
 "Morning Glory"

Charts

References

External links
 
 
 
 
 

1988 singles
1988 songs
Enya songs
Warner Music Group singles
Geffen Records singles
Songs with music by Enya
Songs with lyrics by Roma Ryan
Song recordings produced by Ross Cullum